Johannes Hendrikus Olde Riekerink (born 22 February 1963) is a Dutch football coach and former professional player who is head coach of Indonesian club Dewa United.

Career

Playing career
Born in Hengelo, Olde Riekerink played professionally for Sparta Rotterdam, FC Dordrecht and Telstar between 1985 and 1993.

Coaching career
Olde Riekerink worked at Ajax as a youth coach from 1995 to 2002. He later managed Belgian club Gent and Dutch club FC Emmen, and has also been Assistant Manager at Portuguese club Porto and Ukrainian club Metalurh Donetsk. He was appointed Head of Youth Development of Jong Ajax in April 2007., on 15 June it was announced that Olde Riekerink would give up his position at the club after irreconcilable differences with new board-member Johan Cruyff.

He became manager of Turkish club Galatasaray  in March 2016. Under Olde Riekerink, Galatasaray won 1–0 against Fenerbahçe in the 2016 Turkish Cup Final on 26 May 2016. He was sacked in February 2017.

He was manager of Dutch club SC Heerenveen from 2018 to April 2019.

On 6 November 2019, he was presented as the new coach of South African club Cape Town City. He left the role on 21 May 2021. Later that month he signed a three-year contract with Turkish club İskenderunspor to become their CEO.

In January 2023 he became head coach of Indonesian club Dewa United.

Personal life
His brother Edwin was also a professional player.

References

1963 births
Living people
Sportspeople from Hengelo
Association football midfielders
Dutch footballers
Eredivisie players
Eerste Divisie players
Sparta Rotterdam players
FC Dordrecht players
SC Telstar players
Dutch football managers
AFC Ajax non-playing staff
K.A.A. Gent managers
FC Emmen managers
Jong Ajax managers
Galatasaray S.K. (football) managers
SC Heerenveen managers
Dutch expatriate football managers
Dutch expatriate sportspeople in Belgium
Expatriate football managers in Belgium
Dutch expatriate sportspeople in Portugal
Dutch expatriate sportspeople in Ukraine
Dutch expatriate sportspeople in China
Expatriate football managers in China
Dutch expatriate sportspeople in Turkey
Expatriate football managers in Turkey
Cape Town City F.C. (2016) managers
Dutch expatriate sportspeople in South Africa
Expatriate soccer managers in South Africa
Footballers from Overijssel
Dutch expatriates in Indonesia
Expatriate football managers in Indonesia